Emmanuel Aquin (born 27 January 1968 in Montreal) is a Canadian novelist, screenwriter, editor, graphic artist and illustrator. He is the son of Hubert Aquin and Andrée Yanacopoulo.

He has published 11 novels in French, writing in several genres.

He is also one of the co-founders of the Quebec publishing house Point de Fuite. He presently works as a screenwriter on TV projects and as a writer of children's books.

References

1968 births
Living people
Writers from Montreal
Canadian male novelists
20th-century Canadian novelists
21st-century Canadian novelists
Canadian novelists in French
20th-century Canadian male writers
21st-century Canadian male writers